Tocowa is a ghost town located just outside Batesville in Panola County, Mississippi, United States.

History

In 1938, Federal Writers' Project wrote up a sketch of the town, and surmised its name to be derived Chickasaw and Choctaw languages meaning "healing waters". However, more recent scholarship rejects the "healing waters" interpretation, and purports the name to mean "broken and bent down trees" or "firewood".

During the late 18th century, and well into the 19th century, the town grew around a natural spring. The spring was used as a socializing area by Native Americans who believed in the spring's mysterious healing powers and that the water could heal braves wounded in battle. In the May 25, 1867 edition of The Weekly Panola Star newspaper, the spring was described as "a fine, clear, and bold running mineral spring of known and well attested medicinal virtues".

Notable natives
Former Mississippi governor Ronnie Musgrove was born and raised in Tocowa. At that time, the town had a population of 42.

External links
Read the May 1938 book Mississippi: A Guide to the Magnolia State in its entirety.

References

Former populated places in Panola County, Mississippi
Populated places established in 1865
1865 establishments in Mississippi
1940s disestablishments in Mississippi
Former populated places in Mississippi
Mississippi placenames of Native American origin